Mike Schafer is the men's ice hockey coach at Cornell University.  He graduated from Cornell in 1986 with a degree in business management after leading the team to its first conference tournament championship in six years. Schafer retired as a player after his senior season and immediately became an assistant with the Big Red. Schafer left his alma mater after the 1989–90 season, taking a similar position with the Western Michigan Broncos of the WCHA. Five years later, after a downturn in the program that saw three consecutive losing seasons (including back-to-back single digit-win years) Cornell replaced Brian McCutcheon with Schafer as head coach. Schafer quickly returned the Big Red to prominence, winning the ECAC Hockey conference tournament his first two seasons back in Ithaca. Schafer has remained with Cornell ever since, becoming the longest tenured and the winningest coach in team history.

Career
Schafer has been credited as one of college hockey's premier defensive coaches as his teams consistently produce among the lowest goals allowed annually. Two of Schafer's goaltenders (David LeNeveu in 2003 and David McKee in 2005) hold the second and third lowest goals against averages in NCAA history for one season with the former backstopping the Big Red to their first frozen four since 1980 and first overall seed in 2003 (a rarity for ECAC programs). Schafer has made more appearances in the ECAC tournament championship game than any other head coach with 11 and is tied (with Joe Marsh) for the most victories at 5. Schafer's 2003 team is thus far the only one to reach 30 wins in Cornell's history (though the 1970 undefeated and untied championship team only played 29 games, finishing 29-0-0).

Schafer was named co-winner of the 2020 Spencer Penrose Award as Division I Coach of the Year with Brad Berry of University of North Dakota. The Big Red went 23-2-4 (18-2-2 ECAC) before the season was cut short by the coronavirus pandemic.

Head coaching record

See also
List of college men's ice hockey coaches with 400 wins

References

External links

Canadian ice hockey coaches
Cornell Big Red men's ice hockey players
Western Michigan Broncos ice hockey coaches
Cornell Big Red men's ice hockey coaches
Ice hockey people from Ontario
Living people
Year of birth missing (living people)
Canadian ice hockey defencemen